Queen of the Northwoods is 1929 American silent Western film serial by Pathé, directed by Spencer Gordon Bennet and Thomas Storey, with a story by George Arthur Gray. Known cast members were Walter Miller, Ethlyne Clair and Frank Lackteen. This serial was silent, had ten episodes and is believed to still exist in an incomplete state (missing a few episodes).

Plot
A mysterious masked villain known as the Wolf Devil tries to drive all of the non-native settlers out of Alaska. Walter Miller plays a Royal Canadian Mounted Police officer named Inspector Steele. The Wolf Devil kidnaps the heroine, Miss Moreau.

Cast
 Walter Miller - Inspector Steele
 Ethlyne Clair - Miss Moreau
 Tom London - Garvin / The Wolf-Devil
 Frank Lackteen - Jacques De Brun
 Edward Cecil - Fergus
 George Magrill - Sergeant Bolt
 Nelson McDowell - Flapjack
 Jean Diamond - Moon River Lady
 Arthur Taylor
 Fred Burns
 Arthur Dewey

The Wolf Devil
The villain of the serial is one of film's first werewolves (in the traditional sense of a man masquerading and acting like a wolf rather than the now more common film wolfman).  This villain, The Wolf Devil, wears a wolf skin headdress that completely covers his face.  The supernatural atmosphere is enhanced by his apparent ability to control a pack of wolves.

See also
 List of film serials
 List of film serials by studio

References

External links
 

1929 films
American silent serial films
American black-and-white films
Northern (genre) films
Pathé Exchange film serials
Films directed by Spencer Gordon Bennet
Royal Canadian Mounted Police in fiction
1929 Western (genre) films
Silent American Western (genre) films
1920s English-language films
1920s American films